Biljana is a feminine South Slavic name derived from бела, бяла ("white", "fair") or билка, биле ("medicinal herb"). It is usually found in Serbia, Croatia, North Macedonia and Bulgaria. It may refer to:

 Biljana Dekic, Yugoslav-born Australian chess Woman International Master
 Biljana Jakovljević (born 1988), Serbian politician
 Biljana Kovačević-Vučo (1952–2010), Serbian human rights and anti-war activist
 Biljana Bilja Krstić (born 1955), Serbian singer
 Biljana Petrović (born 1961), Serbian retired high jumper
 Biljana Plavšić (born 1930), Bosnian Serb former politician and university professor, President of Republika Srpska convicted of crimes against humanity
 Biljana Srbljanović (born 1970), Serbian playwright and university professor
 Biljana Stojković (born 1972), Serbian biologist, activist, professor and politician
 Biljana Topić (born 1977), Serbian triple jumper and sprinter

See also
 
 Biljana platno beleše, the folk song

Notes

External links
http://www.behindthename.com/name/biljana
https://onomast.com/name/28951/Biljana
Slavic feminine given names
Bosnian feminine given names
Bulgarian feminine given names
Croatian feminine given names
Given names derived from plants or flowers
Macedonian feminine given names
Montenegrin feminine given names
Slovene feminine given names
Serbian feminine given names